Live at Low End Theory is a live album by American electronic music producer Daedelus. It was released on Alpha Pup Records in 2008. Recorded live at Low End Theory in July 2007, it was mixed and mastered by Daddy Kev.

Critical reception
Marisa Brown of AllMusic gave the album 4 stars out of 5, saying: "Although Daedelus certainly relies on a lot of computer wizardry when he crafts his albums, the producer proves that he's just as capable of putting on an energetic and dynamic live show as anyone else, be they electronica artists or not." Tim O Neil of PopMatters gave the album 8 stars out of 10, saying: "It's casual, almost scattershot in a charming way that offers up an entirely different vantage on the man's music."

Track listing

References

External links
 

2008 live albums
Daedelus (musician) albums
Alpha Pup Records live albums